Ralston is a city in Carroll and Greene counties in the U.S. state of Iowa. The population was 81 at the time of the 2020 census.

History
Ralston was incorporated in 1900. It was named for William Chapman Ralston, a California banker.

Geography
Ralston is located at  (42.041801, -94.630538).

Demographics

2010 census
As of the census of 2010, there were 79 people, 38 households, and 19 families living in the city. The racial makeup of the city was 100.0% White.

There were 38 households, of which 26.3% had children under the age of 18 living with them, 36.8% were married couples living together, 2.6% had a female householder with no husband present, 10.5% had a male householder with no wife present, and 50.0% were non-families. 47.4% of all households were made up of individuals, and 23.7% had someone living alone who was 65 years of age or older. The average household size was 2.08 and the average family size was 2.84.

The median age in the city was 40.3 years. 25.3% of residents were under the age of 18; 6.4% were between the ages of 18 and 24; 29.2% were from 25 to 44; 24.1% were from 45 to 64; and 15.2% were 65 years of age or older. The gender makeup of the city was 48.1% male and 51.9% female.

2000 census
As of the census of 2000, there were 98 people, 39 households, and 28 families living in the city. There were 47 housing units at an average density of 23.8 per square mile (9.2/km). The racial makeup of the city was 100.00% White.

There were 39 households, out of which 30.8% had children under the age of 18 living with them, 66.7% were married couples living together, 2.6% had a female householder with no husband present, and 28.2% were non-families. 25.6% of all households were made up of individuals, and 12.8% had someone living alone who was 65 years of age or older. The average household size was 2.51 and the average family size was 3.07.

24.5% are under the age of 18, 6.1% from 18 to 24, 27.6% from 25 to 44, 29.6% from 45 to 64, and 12.2% who were 65 years of age or older. The median age was 41 years. For every 100 females, there were 122.7 males. For every 100 females age 18 and over, there were 117.6 males.

The median income for a household in the city was $34,375, and the median income for a family was $44,000. Males had a median income of $27,083 versus $22,083 for females. The per capita income for the city was $15,746. There were no families and 0.9% of the population living below the poverty line, including no under eighteens and 16.7% of those over 64.

Education
The Glidden–Ralston Community School District operates area schools.

References

Cities in Carroll County, Iowa
Cities in Greene County, Iowa
Cities in Iowa
1900 establishments in Iowa